The National Cigar and Tobacco Workers' Union was a trade union representing tobacco workers in the United Kingdom.

The union was founded in 1918 when the Female Cigar Makers' Protection Union merged with the Cigar Makers' Mutual Association, the Cigar Sorters' and Bundlers' Mutual Association (London), and the Tobacco Strippers' Mutual Society.  The merger took place on the initiative of Ben Cooper, leader of the Cigar Makers', but he was soon replaced by Alf Santen, who led the union almost throughout its existence.

By 1939, the union had 3,000 members, most of whom were women.  In 1946, it merged into the Tobacco Workers' Union.

General Secretaries
1918: Ben Cooper
1919: Alf Santen
1945: E. Lemon

References

Defunct trade unions of the United Kingdom
1918 establishments in the United Kingdom
Tobacco industry trade unions
Trade unions established in 1918
Trade unions disestablished in 1946
Trade unions based in London